The Mills are a Colombian rock band based in Bogotá. The band's musical style is greatly influenced by Alternative rock. Their first album, Babel, reached No. 1 at Colombian radio stations Radioactiva and La X. They are managed by Roberto Andrade Dirak.

History
2007-2009: Influenced by alternative rock bands U2, Coldplay and Radiohead, the band was formed in 2007 and released an EP entitled Don't Care What They Think. It featured English lyrics and was produced by Luis Charry, guitarist for The Hall Effect.

The band gained recognition as one of the new leading acts in Colombian rock, according to an article in the Colombian edition of Rolling Stone Magazine, which paid compliments to the band's British influences and sound quality.

In 2008, The Mills released two singles, "Before I Go to Sleep" and "Let It Go". The Mills also were invited to play as an opening act at "Colombia Fest", supporting R.E.M. and The Mars Volta.

2009-2011: Babel
The mills released their first album: Babel. This album was recorded in Bogota by the discografy of Cabeza de raton and it shows a mixture of alternative rock, indie and latin rock. This first album has 13 songs in Spanish and English with great singles like: "Before i go to sleep" and "Abran fuego". This album also has a cover of "Lobo hombre en paris" of the Spanish rock band La Union. This singles rise up the Mills to the top of the best Colombian rockbands.

2011-2013: Guadalupe
They released a second named Gudalupe, 

2014:
The band show their new single: "El amor duele" from a new next album.

Members
Bako (Álvaro Charry) – vocals
Geogy (Jorge Luis Bello) – guitar
Dizee (Diego Cáceres) – keyboards, backing vocals
Ray (Ramón Gutiérrez) – bass
Cadavid (Diego Cadavid) – drums

Discography
Don't Care What They Think (EP). Independent (2007)
Babel. (2009)
Guadalupe. (2011)

References

External links

Before I Go To Sleep (videoclip, 2009) Spanish
The Mills en MySpace Spanish

Colombian rock music groups
Musical groups established in 2007
Musical groups from Bogotá